Upon Entry is a 2022 Spanish drama film directed by Alejandro Rojas and Juan Sebastián Vásquez (in their directorial debut feature). It stars Alberto Ammann and Bruna Cusí alongside Ben Temple and Laura Gómez.

Plot 
The plot concerns about the unpleasant vetting and questioning procedures that the couple formed by Diego (Venezuelan urbanist) and Elena (a contemporary dancer from Barcelona) suffers at the Newark Airport upon moving from Barcelona to the United States to start off a new life.

Cast

Production 
Written and directed by Alejandro Rojas and Juan Sebastián Vásquez, Upon Entry is based on the helmers' personal experiences as immigrants.

Release 
Upon Entry screened at the Tallinn Black Nights Film Festival (PÖFF) in November 2022. It also made it to the official selection of the 28th Kolkata International Film Festival. It was picked up by Charade and Anonymous Content ahead of its screening at the South by Southwest (SXSW) for its North-American premiere.

Reception 
Júlia Olmo of Cineuropa assessed that despite the film seemingly touching towards its end upon the clichés it managed to steer clear of before, it "manages to be an enjoyable film", "to achieve its verisimilitude and to make us forget for a while" "that we are watching a fictional film".

Jonathan Holland of ScreenDaily considered that the film "plays out in that grey zone where legitimate questioning ends and the state torture manual begins", pointing out how generating "so much drama from what is basically 74 minutes of people talking across a table at one another is very clever film making indeed".

Accolades 

|-
| rowspan = "2" align = "center" | 2022 || 26th Tallinn Black Nights Film Festival || colspan = "2" | FIPRESCI Award ||  || 
|-	
| 28th Kolkata International Film Festival || colspan = "2" | Golden Bengal Royal Tiger Award for Best Film ||  || 
|-
| rowspan = "1" align = "center" | 2023 || 26th Málaga Film Festival || Silver Biznaga for Best Actor || Alberto Ammann ||  || align = "center" |  
|}

See also 
 List of Spanish films of 2023

References 

2022 films
2022 drama films
Spanish drama films
2020s Spanish films
2020s Spanish-language films
2020s English-language films
2020s Catalan-language films
Films set in airports
Films set in New York City
Films about immigration to the United States
2022 directorial debut films